The 1963 European Cup final was a football match between Milan and Benfica, held at Wembley Stadium, London, on 22 May 1963. Milan won the match 2–1, winning the European Cup for the first time. Runners-up Benfica made their third consecutive appearance in the final, having won both the 1961 and 1962 finals.

Milan's win in this match marked the first European Cup title for any Italian side. This match was also the first European Cup final not to feature a team from Spain.

Route to the final

Match

Details

See also
1962–63 European Cup
1963 European Cup Winners' Cup Final
1963 Intercontinental Cup
1990 European Cup final – contested between same teams
A.C. Milan in European football
S.L. Benfica in international football

Notes

References

External links
1962–63 season at UEFA.com
1962–63 season at European Cup History
Video highlights from official Pathé News archive

1
European Cup Final 1963
European Cup Final 1963
UEFA Champions League finals
European Cup Final 1963
Euro
Euro
European Cup Final
European Cup Final